McCarthy Catholic College is an independent Roman Catholic co-educational secondary day school located in , New South Wales, Australia. The college is administered by the Catholic Education Office of the Diocese of Armidale.

Overview
McCarthy Catholic College is a co-educational Catholic high school for students in years 7 to 12. It was formed in 2000 through the amalgamation of Our Lady of the Rosary College (for years 7-10)  and McCarthy Catholic Senior High School (for years 11-12). For historical reasons the college is named for Irish priest Father Timothy McCarthy (1829-1879) who was the first resident priest in the New England Region from 1853 to 1874 and worked for the education of children.

College logo and mission statement
McCarthy's Logo is a combination of a gold Chi Rho and the constellation of the Southern Cross on a navy blue background. The terms Receive, Worship and Serve are part of the McCarthy Catholic College Mission Statement.

History
The school is built on land that was first by the Kamilaroi people. A school was founded on its current site by the Dominican Sister Patricia Rowe in the 1970s, and the connection with Dominicans was maintained until 2011, when they left Tamworth. The Christian Brothers also worked to found the school and Brother Brian Moylan was its first assistant principal, with the order providing many teachers as part of their wider work on education in New South Wales. The school no longer has a connection to these orders.

In 1972 McCarthy Catholic Senior High School was established (Years 11 and 12), to cater for all senior students of the boys school the Christian Brothers College Tamworth and the all girls school St Dominic's, with classes initially held at both schools until in June 1975 new buildings on Tribe Street were ready. Over the next 25 years the school expanded in enrollment and new buildings were added to the campus – including a library.

In 1980 it was decided that a new co-educational 7 to 10 school, would be established. By July 1981 the Warral Rd. site was ready and the students moved in, with the official opening in October 1981 of Our Lady of the Rosary College.

Merger and opening of McCarthy Catholic College
In August 1997 it was decided that the financial and other costs of running two separate schools necessitated an amalgamation of the two high schools, with the decision taken to relocate Rosary College to the Tribe Street site and form a 7-12 co-educational school. It was decided the name of the new school (McCarthy Catholic College) would be used to maintain the previous link with Father Tim McCarthy.

The school was established in 2000, operating for a time on the two separate campuses. By 2002 enough new buildings had been completed to relocate all Year 10 students to the new school. The next stages of the school building were completed by July 2004. Older buildings were refurbished and new ones built. The school was blessed and opened by Bishop Luc Matthys in November 2004. Additional classroom areas and a covered outdoor learning area were part of ongoing improvements made in subsequent years. In 2017 Bishop Michael Kennedy opened the latest addition to the school, Our Lady of the Rosary Cultural Centre. The building houses a large performance hall, a recording studio, classrooms and music practice rooms.

See also 

 List of Catholic schools in New South Wales
 Catholic education in Australia

References 

Catholic secondary schools in New South Wales
2000 establishments in Australia
Educational institutions established in 2000
Tamworth, New South Wales